is Tohoshinki's 22nd Japanese single, released on April 23, 2008 shortly before the completion of the T album Japan tour. "Sennen Koi Uta" was used as the opening theme for "The Legend (太王四神記)", a Korean drama that was later aired in Japan. Oricon News predicted that the consecutive releases of the previous single albums as well as the popularity of the historical drama series were expected to boost the sales of the latest single.

It is Tohoshinki's second #1 single on the Weekly Oricon Charts. Similar to their "Purple Line" single, they wrote history again in the Japanese music industry by becoming the second foreign artist, next to Ou Yang Fei Fei, to have 2 chart-toppers. According to the Oricon, TVXQ succeeded Ou Yang Fei Fei's position after 24 years and 5 months.

Track listing

Release history

Music video

"Beautiful You"
In the music video for "Beautiful You" it shows all the members in a house in other rooms like the bathroom or sitting near the stairs. There is other scenes of them dancing.

"Sennen Koi Uta"
This music video features a lot of scenes from the movie called The Legend.

Chart positions 
Oricon sales charts (Japan)

References

External links
 https://web.archive.org/web/20080409203505/http://toho-jp.net/index.html

2008 singles
TVXQ songs
Oricon Weekly number-one singles
Avex Trax singles
Rhythm Zone singles